Marek Andrzej Kusto (born 29 April 1954 in Bochnia) is a retired Polish football player and manager.

He played for several domestic and foreign clubs, including Wisła Kraków, Legia Warsaw and KSK Beveren (Belgium), and for the Polish national team, participating in three consecutive World Cups: the 1974 FIFA World Cup, where Poland won the bronze medal; the 1978 FIFA World Cup; and 1982 FIFA World Cup, where Poland again won the bronze medal.

He later worked as a coach for such clubs as Wisła Kraków, Widzew Łódź and Arka Gdynia, among others.

References

1954 births
Living people
Polish footballers
Poland international footballers
Polish football managers
1974 FIFA World Cup players
1978 FIFA World Cup players
1982 FIFA World Cup players
Polish expatriate footballers
Wisła Kraków players
Legia Warsaw players
K.S.K. Beveren players
Wisła Kraków managers
Arka Gdynia managers
Widzew Łódź managers
People from Bochnia
Sportspeople from Lesser Poland Voivodeship
Wawel Kraków players
Association football forwards
Belgian Pro League players